The Vraj Hindu Temple is located in Schuylkill County, in eastern Pennsylvania, United States, two miles west of the intersection of Routes 183 and 895.  It is a multimillion-dollar temple or haveli covering  of the land. Vraj is also known as Nootan  Nandalay, and abode for God Shrinathji (a manifestation of Krishna). It is visited by an average of 100,000 Hindu pilgrims per year. Vraj offers daily prayers (Darshans), annual events and volunteer opportunities for young people.

History
Vraj Hindu Temple before 1987 was a Yoga recreational center. The land was bought in the summer of 1987 by the visionary and founder Govind Bhikhabhai Shah (Kaka) with the support of 29 others. The temple became official in November 1988 during the inaugural Patotsav Celebration when Shrinathji graced his presence for the first time at Vraj.

Darshans (prayer events)
Darshan is a sanctum that is organized six times a day (everyday) as different prayers. Each Darshan has a special mood, emotion, clothes, music and food:
Mangala - to underline the auspiciousness of the beginning the day.
Shringar - Shrinathji is dressed, and a flower garland is placed around his neck.
Raajbhoog - the main meal of the day with different types of sweet.
Utthapan - for when Shrinathji is believed to wake up from afternoon siesta.
Sandhya Arati - an evening prayer with light garland.
Shayan - a celebration with music and drumming to herald the final prayer of the day.

Vraj Youth
Vraj contains a youth group consisting of young volunteers and students from all over the USA. It was created to encourage service to the community and broaden knowledge of Indian Heritage. Vraj youth members are mostly in high school, college, graduate school, or working with ages ranging anywhere from 16 to 28.

Vraj youth are involved in all occasions offered from the temple such as prayers, food, festive celebrations or any other community services.

Vraj youth also holds annual summer camps called Vraj Youth Camp. Youth of different age groups get together to enjoy a week of fun.
Schedule
6:30 Wakeup call
7:00-8:00 Morning walk/yoga/Mangala Darshan
8:00-9:00 Breakfast
9:00-10:00 Shower
10:00-12:15 Classes (Gujarati, Culture, and Religion)
12:15-1:00 free time 
1:00-4:00 activity
4:00 snack
4:00-6:00 skit prep 
6:00-7:00 dinner 
7:30-9:00 campfire
9:30 lights out

References

External links

Hindu temples in Pennsylvania
Religious organizations established in 1988
Buildings and structures in Schuylkill County, Pennsylvania
Tourist attractions in Schuylkill County, Pennsylvania
1988 establishments in Pennsylvania
Indian-American culture in Pennsylvania
Asian-American culture in Pennsylvania